Straßenhaus is a municipality in the district of Neuwied, in Rhineland-Palatinate, Germany.

The municipality is spelled with an ß which may be replaced by ss if not available (Strassenhaus), as in, e.g., the website www.strassenhaus.de.

References

Neuwied (district)